Peter Gonville Stein, QC, FBA (29 May 1926 – 7 August 2016) was a British legal scholar. 

He was Professor of Jurisprudence at the University of Aberdeen from 1956 to 1968 and Regius Professor of Civil Law at the University of Cambridge from 1968 until his retirement in 1993.

Biography 

Peter Stein was educated at Liverpool College and later studied at Gonville and Caius College, Cambridge, where he obtained his BA in 1949.  He obtained his LLB in Cambridge as an external in 1950, and became a solicitor in 1951.  He completed a scholarship at the University of Pavia before becoming an Assistant Lecturer in Law in the University of Nottingham, in 1952.  He then moved to the University of Aberdeen, where he obtained his PhD, and he was Lecturer (1953-56) and then Professor (1956-1968) in Jurisprudence.

Back to Cambridge, Stein was Regius Professor of Civil Law and Fellow of Queens' College, Cambridge between 1968 and 1993.  He remained Emeritus Professor of Civil Law and Life Fellow of Queens' College until his death in 2016.

Honours
In 1974, Stein was elected Fellow of the British Academy (FBA). On 20 April 1993, he was appointed an honorary Queen's Counsel (QC). He was also President of the Academy of the European Private Lawyers - Accademia dei Giusprivatisti Europei (Pavia).

Works
 Fault in the formation of contract in Roman law and Scots law (1958)
 Regulae Juris: from juristic rules to legal maxims (1966)
 
 
 
 The character and influence of the Roman civil law: historical essays (1988)

References

External links 
 
 
 
 

1926 births
2016 deaths
British solicitors
Academics of the University of Aberdeen
Alumni of Gonville and Caius College, Cambridge
Place of birth missing
British King's Counsel
Fellows of the British Academy
Regius Professors of Civil Law (University of Cambridge)
Fellows of Queens' College, Cambridge
Honorary King's Counsel
People educated at Liverpool College